Dov Shurin is an Israeli singer-songwriter, who is also known for his far-right political views, conveyed both through his music and media appearances, related to the Jewish sovereignty of Israel and the settlement of occupied territories in the region.

Background
Born in 1949, Shurin moved from Brooklyn, New York to Israel in 1984. He is an Orthodox Jew and a grandson of Rabbi Yaakov Kamenetsky.

He currently lives in the Sansur building in downtown Jerusalem.

Musical style
Shurin's music ranges from soft folk ballads to electric guitar, fast-paced, danceable music. His lyrics range from original to biblical sources or a mashup of the two. A major hit of his was "Zochreini Na" (Hebrew: זכרני נא). The lyrics of the song are the prayer of Samson asking God to restore his strength so he can exact his revenge upon Philistines who had captured and blinded him (Book of Judges 16:28), but with the word "Philistines" replaced with "Palestine". The song was initially popular mainly on Israeli settlements before gradually spreading to non-settler circles, where the lyrics were restored to the original wording of the Biblical verse.  An Israeli wedding in 2015 celebrated the Duma arson attack while playing the song, and it was also chanted during the 2021 Jerusalem clashes.

Shurin is noted for his Kahanist political views. The struggle for the Land of Israel is a recurring theme in his music.

Media appearances
He was featured on the cover of The Economist with a Bible in one hand and an Uzi in the other.

Shurin has been featured in documentaries and briefly became a pop star within the settler movement with songs calling for violence against the Palestinians and resistance to Israel's 2005 withdrawal from the Gaza Strip.

Shurin featured in Settlers, a documentary made in 2002 by British director Sean McAllister. In the film Shurin states that although he believes that the Land of Israel belongs solely to the Jewish people, he has no problem being friendly with individual Arabs. A scene shows Shurin interceding on behalf of an elderly Arab man who was stopped at the Western Wall Plaza by Israeli security; Shurin stated that he is proud of what he did and that this deed was a Mitzvah.

Discography
 I See the Sunrise (1980, rereleased as Kol Dodi: Voice of my Love)
 Chakal Tapuchim: The field of Sacred Apples (1984), with "Uncle" Dovid Lybush
 You Are With Me (1985, released 2000) with Shlomo Carlebach
 Madly in Love With The One Above (1999)
 Biblical Revenge "The Nekama Album" (2002)
 Purim XTC (2002)
 Zion Square Band in Jerusalem Live (2004)
 Masters of the Land "The Nechama Album" (2004)
 Shuvi El Irayich (2009)
 Charming Nation (2011)

References 

1949 births
American emigrants to Israel
American Kahanists
American Orthodox Jews
Israeli Kahanists
20th-century Israeli male singers
Israeli Orthodox Jews
Israeli songwriters
21st-century Israeli male singers
Jewish American songwriters
Jewish singers
Musicians from New York City
People from Jerusalem
Living people
Songwriters from New York (state)
Hasidic singers